Raytheon Missiles & Defense (RMD) is one of four business segments of Raytheon Technologies. Headquartered in Tucson, Arizona, its president is Wes Kremer. The business produces a broad portfolio of advanced technologies, including air and missile defense systems, precision weapons, radars, and command and control systems.

History
The business is a combination of two Raytheon Company legacy businesses, Raytheon Integrated Defense Systems (IDS) and Raytheon Missile Systems (RMS), which operated a plant formerly owned by the Hughes Aircraft Company. David Leighton, a noted historian, documented the early history of the Hughes Missile Plant in two books. His monograph: The Falcon's Nest: The Hughes Missile Plant in Tucson, 1947–1960, which included the early history of Hughes Aircraft Co., and, his reference book: The History of the Hughes Missile Plant in Tucson, 1947–1960.

Key Raytheon Missiles & Defense capabilities combine key IDS and RMS capabilities.

Key IDS capabilities include:
 Ground-based and sea-based radars for air and missile defense
 Navy radar and sonar
 Torpedoes and naval mine countermeasures
Key RMS capabilities include:
 Missiles and precision-guided munitions
 Drones and air-launched decoys
 Counter-drone and non-lethal directed energy weapons
 Ground vehicle sensors and weapons

Raytheon has been criticized for selling arms to Saudi Arabia that were used in the Yemen Civil War. These sales were blocked by the Obama administration in 2015 due to humanitarian concerns, a decision that was reversed by the Trump administration six months later.

Products
The division's products include:
 Active Denial System non-lethal millimeter wave weapon
 AGM-65 Maverick air-to-surface missile
 AGM-88 HARM air-to-surface missile
 AGM-129 ACM air-to-surface missile
 AGM-154 Joint Standoff Weapon air-to-surface glide bomb
 AGM-176 Griffin air-to-surface missile
 AIM-7 Sparrow air-to-air missile
 RIM-7 Sea Sparrow naval surface-to-air missile
 AIM-9 Sidewinder air-to-air missile
 AIM-54 Phoenix air-to-air missile
 AIM-120 AMRAAM air-to-air missile
 AN/SPY-6 Air and Missile Defense Radar (AMDR) for Navy ships
 AN/TPY-2 radar for the THAAD missile defense system
 AN/AQS20C Mine hunting sonar suite
 AN/ASQ-235 Airborne Mine Neutralization System (AMNS)
 BGM-71 TOW anti-tank missile
 BGM-109 Tomahawk cruise missile
 Coyote unmanned aerial system
 Extended Range Guided Munition
 Exoatmospheric Kill Vehicle anti-ICBM system
 FGM-148 Javelin anti-tank missile
 FIM-92 Stinger person-portable air defense system surface-to-air missile
 M982 Excalibur guided artillery round
 MIM-23 Hawk surface-to-air missile
 MIM-104 Patriot surface-to-air missile
 Paveway laser-guided bomb
 Phalanx CIWS naval anti-missile defense system
 RIM-116 Rolling Airframe Missile naval surface-to-air missile
 RIM-162 Evolved Sea Sparrow Missile naval surface-to-air missile
 Standard Missile family of naval missiles
 RIM-66 Standard
 RIM-67 Standard
 RIM-161 Standard Missile 3
 RIM-174 Standard ERAM
 SAM-N-2 Lark

References

External links
 

Raytheon Company
Guided missile manufacturers
Companies based in Tucson, Arizona
Defense companies of the United States
Raytheon Technologies